Polypoetes approximans is a moth of the family Notodontidae. It is found from Panama north to Costa Rica.

The larvae feed on Pachira aquatica. They show prominent blackish dorsal spots.

References

Moths described in 1901
Notodontidae